Walter R. and Eliza Smith Moore House is a historic home located near Clayton, Johnston County, North Carolina.  It was built circa 1835. It is a two-story, four-bay, single-pile, vernacular Federal style heavy timber frame dwelling.  It sits on a brick foundation, is sheathed in weatherboard, and has a two-story front portico.  Also on the property is a contributing meat house (c. 1835).

It was listed on the National Register of Historic Places in 2005.

References

Houses on the National Register of Historic Places in North Carolina
Federal architecture in North Carolina
Houses completed in 1835
Houses in Johnston County, North Carolina
National Register of Historic Places in Johnston County, North Carolina